RMG Networks, formerly Symon Communications, is a digital signage company headquartered in Texas.

RMG is headquartered in Dallas with offices in the United States and United Kingdom.

History

1980 – 2013   Early Symon Years
Reach Media Group was founded in 2006 as Danoo and received financial backing from Kleiner Perkins Caufield & Byers, DAG Ventures, National CineMedia and Tennenbaum Capital Partners. In July 2009, Danoo acquired IdeaCast.  In August 2009, the company renamed itself RMG Networks and appointed Garry McGuire to take over as CEO from Aileen Lee.

2013 – 2018  Transition to RMG Networks
In April 2013, the company acquired Symon Communications, a digital signage company founded in 1980, for $45.5 million and moved its headquarters from San Francisco to the Dallas metropolitan area where Symon Communications was located. The company went public via a reverse merger with SCG Financial Acquisition Corp. in April 2013.

References

Companies based in Dallas
American companies established in 1980